Henry Bryant Bigelow (October 3, 1879 – December 11, 1967) was an American oceanographer and marine biologist.

He is the grandson of Henry Bryant  who was an American physician and naturalist.

After graduating from Harvard in 1901, he began working with famed ichthyologist Alexander Agassiz. Bigelow accompanied Agassiz on several major marine science expeditions including one aboard the Albatross in 1907. He began working at the Museum of Comparative Zoology in 1905 and joined Harvard's faculty in 1906 where he worked for 62 years.

In 1911, Bigelow was elected a Fellow of the American Academy of Arts and Sciences. He helped found the Woods Hole Oceanographic Institution in 1930 and was its founding director. During his life he published more than one hundred papers and several books. He was a world-renowned expert on coelenterates and elasmobranchs.

In 1948 Bigelow was awarded the Daniel Giraud Elliot Medal from the National Academy of Sciences.

Honors
The Henry Bryant Bigelow Medal in Oceanography is awarded by the Woods Hole Oceanographic Institution to honor "those who make significant inquiries into the phenomena of the sea".  Bigelow was the first recipient of the medal in 1960.

He was honored by the naming of the National Oceanic and Atmospheric Administration research vessel NOAAS Henry B. Bigelow (R 225).

Legacy
Bigelow's Fishes of the Gulf of Maine (with William C. Schroeder) continues to be a useful reference today.

Descriptions
Bigelow described numerous new species to science, 110 of which are recognized today according to the World Register of Marine Species.
See :Category:Taxa named by Henry Bryant Bigelow

Species named for Bigelow
Some 26 species and two genera (Bigelowina, stomatopods in family Nannosquillidae, and Bigelowiella, protists in family Chlorarachniophyte) are named after him, including  Bigelow's ray, Rajella bigelowi , and Etmopterus bigelowi, a lantern shark.

References

External links
Bigelow Laboratory

American marine biologists
American taxonomists
1879 births
1967 deaths
American ichthyologists
Cnidariologists
American oceanographers
Fellows of the American Academy of Arts and Sciences
Harvard University alumni
Harvard University faculty
20th-century American zoologists